Frank Nolan may refer to:

Frank Nolan (cricketer) (1920–2009), Australian cricketer
Frank Nolan (footballer) (1915–1989), Australian rules footballer

See also
Frankie Nolan (born 1950), Irish sportsperson